The Ege University Observatory (EUO) is a ground-based astronomical observatory operated by the Astronomy and Space Sciences Department at Ege University's  Faculty of Science.

The facility was officially renamed Ege University Observatory Application and Research Center on August 12, 2009.

History
Soon after the establishment of the Astronomy Department at Ege University in 1963, a project to establish an observatory was developed. Kurudağ was chosen as the location for the observatory, a site far from urban light pollution but close to the university's campus.

The first instruments of the observatory were a 15-cm Unitron telescope, a Foucault pendulum and an Iris photometer.  By 2013, night observations were becoming difficult due to glare from urban encroachment.

Instruments
Currently, the observatory consists of following telescopes and instruments:

Telescopes
 13 cm spectrograph (1967)
 48 cm Cassegrain telescope (1968)
 30 cm Meade telescope (1999) 
 35 cm Meade telescope (2004)
 40 cm Meade telescope (2004)

Receivers-photometers
 High-speed three-channel photometer (48 cm)
 2 pieces CCD cameras (35 and 40 cm telescopes)
 2 pieces SSP-5 photometers (30 cm telescope)

A staff of 17 researchers and seven assistants work at the EUO.

References 

Astronomical observatories in Turkey
Observatory
Buildings and structures in İzmir Province
1965 establishments in Turkey